Sachie (written: 幸恵 or 沙知絵) is a feminine Japanese given name. Notable people with the name include:

, Japanese model and actress
, Japanese tennis player
, Japanese former competitive figure skater
, Japanese retired professional wrestler

Japanese feminine given names